Yalnızgöz Bridge is a historic Ottoman bridge in Edirne, Turkey. It crosses the Tunca.

The bridge is a single span constructed during the reign of the Ottoman sultan Selim II (r. 1566-1574). Yalnızgöz means "lone arch". It connects together with Bayezid II Bridge the Complex of Sultan Bayezid II with the city.

References

 Ottoman Architecture, John Freely, page 87, 2011

Ottoman bridges in Turkey
Arch bridges in Turkey
Bridges over the Tunca
Road bridges in Turkey
Bridges in Edirne